Montecaris is a genus of extinct phyllocarid crustaceans found in the Upper Devonian of Europe, Canada, and Australia.

Description 
Montecaris possesses an unornamented, bivalved carapace which terminates in a spiny posterior. It's caudal tail fin is trifurcated and dagger-like.

Due to its streamlined carapace and large tail fin, Montecaris was likely an active nektonic swimmer, which primarily appears in deep water sediments. Its robust mandibles and powerful musculature suggests a carnivorous lifestyle as an active predator or scavenger.

Species 

 M. antecedens Chlupač, 1960
 M. brunnensis Chlupač, 1960
 M. gogoensis Briggs, 2011
 M. lehmanni Jux, 1960 (Possibly synonymous with M. strunensis)
 M. strunensis Jux, 1959
 M. tatarica Krestovnikov, 1961

References 

Prehistoric Malacostraca
Prehistoric crustacean genera
Devonian arthropods
Devonian animals
Fossils of Australia
Fossils of Canada
Fossils of Germany